Christian Wunderlich (born 12 July 1979 in Cologne) is a German actor, singer and songwriter. “Real Good Moments”, his debut album released on 6 September 1999, made him famous not only in Germany, but also in Switzerland. In 2001, he became a support act on some of 2001 "Where Dreams Come True Tour" by Irish pop vocal band Westlife. In 2009 he released his single: “Gelacht, um nicht zu weinen”.

External links

1979 births
Living people
German male television actors
German male singers
German songwriters
Actors from Cologne